Thunder Hawk Creek is a stream in Corson and Perkins counties in the U.S. state of South Dakota. It is a tributary of the Grand River.

Thunder Hawk Creek has the name of a local Indian chief.

See also
List of rivers of South Dakota

References

Rivers of Corson County, South Dakota
Rivers of Perkins County, South Dakota
Rivers of South Dakota